Pamela Fontaine (born 1964 in Columbus, Ohio) is an American Paralympic table tennis player.

She participated in the 1984 Summer Paralympics but decided to retire three years later. She took up wheelchair basketball and won a bronze medal at the 1996 Summer Paralympics. Five years later she returned to table tennis and became a 3-time silver medalist at both the 2007 and 2011 Parapan American Games for both singles and doubles. In 2009 she won 2 gold medals for the same reasons and at the same place. In 2016 she participated in 2016 Summer Paralympics. Prior to participation at the Paralympic games in Rio, she participated at the Slovakian and Slovenian Opens.

References

Living people
1964 births
Paralympic table tennis players of the United States
Paralympic wheelchair basketball players of the United States
Paralympic silver medalists for the United States
Paralympic bronze medalists for the United States
Sportspeople from Columbus, Ohio
Medalists at the 1984 Summer Paralympics
Medalists at the 1996 Summer Paralympics
Table tennis players at the 1984 Summer Paralympics
Table tennis players at the 2012 Summer Paralympics
Wheelchair basketball players at the 1996 Summer Paralympics
Paralympic medalists in wheelchair basketball
Paralympic medalists in table tennis
Medalists at the 2007 Parapan American Games
Medalists at the 2011 Parapan American Games
Medalists at the 2015 Parapan American Games
Basketball players from Columbus, Ohio
American female table tennis players